The Federal Medical Centre, Bida (FMCBida) is a federal medical center own by the federal government of Nigeria and built by the Sani Abacha military administration, it was built in 1997 and its also has a medical institution resided beside it in Bida, Niger state.

The medical center has three major role headed which Chairman Management is the head of office Dr Ishaq Usman, it has an outpost at Gurara Local Government.

Government 
In the coming of the new administration in 2018 the Board  Management inaugurated new member which was commission by Prof Adewale Minister of Health to create opportunities for the youth  who participated and support the victory of the new government.

See also
Federal Medical Center, Azare

Reference 

Niger State
Hospitals in Nigeria
Medical and health organizations based in Nigeria